The Akwa Ibom State Ministry of Education is the state government's ministry tasked with overseeing the education sector in the state, policy formulation and control over Primary, Secondary and State-owned Tertiary Institutions in consonance with the National Policy on Education, and monitoring and evaluation of educational programmes to ensure quality.

The education sector in Akwa Ibom State has seen monumental strides owing particularly to the free, compulsory and qualitative education initiated by the Godswill Akpabio administration where the cost of education in Primary and Secondary school is free.

References 

Government ministries of Akwa Ibom State
Subnational education ministries